The Penrith Panthers are an Australian professional rugby league football club based in the western Sydney suburb of Penrith that competes in the NRL. Penrith are the current reigning NRL Premiers, having won the title four times.

Penrith were admitted to the New South Wales Rugby League (NSWRL) competition in 1967. Penrith struggled for almost twenty years before finally reaching their first finals series. The club achieved its first Grand Final appearance in 1990 but were beaten by the Canberra Raiders 18–14. The following year, Penrith met Canberra again in the 1991 Grand Final, this time winning the game 19–12.

Penrith won the NRL premiership again in 2003. Their most recent premiership achievement was over the Parramatta Eels in the 2022 Grand Final with a 28–12 victory. After losing the 2020 Grand Final to the Melbourne Storm, Penrith became the second club to retain the premiership in the NRL-era, winning in 2021 and 2022.

Ivan Cleary was appointed head coach in October 2018, having previously served in the same role between 2012–15. OAK Milk has been their major sponsor since 2012. Former Penrith premiership winning head coach Phil Gould was the club's general manager but departed in 2019.

History

Varied Penrith teams had played for many years between 1912 and 1966 in the Western Districts League under the control of the Western Suburbs RLFC. In the Parramatta competition after Parramatta was admitted to the NSWRL in 1947, and also in a second-tier Sydney competition introduced by the NSWRL in 1962. By this time a single top level rugby league team had emerged in the Penrith area and in 1964 they became known as the Penrith Panthers. The Panther had been chosen as the Penrith emblem after a public competition won by a graphic artist from Emu Plains named Deidre Copeland.

In 1966 word was out that the New South Wales Rugby League in 1967 would introduce two new teams to the Sydney premiership. There were three teams vying for the two proposed slots, Penrith, Cronulla-Sutherland, and the Wentworthville Magpies. Cronulla-Sutherland had been assured of one place, leaving Penrith and Wentworthville to fight it out for the other place. The NSWRL eventually settled on Penrith due to their location and a win in the 1966 Second Division title.

1967 Season (First Season)
After admission to the competition in 1967, they promptly came second last (11th) on the competition ladder finishing only ahead of fellow 1967 newcomers Cronulla-Sutherland. Hopes were raised in 1968 under new Captain-Coach Bob Boland when they won the pre-season competition and finished 8th, but this improvement proved to be short-lived.

1985 Season (First Finals Appearance)
Penrith had trouble attracting the sort of experienced players they knew they needed, and although they always had good junior talent coming through, they did not get the on-field leadership they needed. Penrith needed to wait until they could develop their own 'stars'. They consequently struggled for almost 20 years before finally reaching their first finals series in 1985 with a team boasting new local star Greg Alexander and captained by Royce Simmons.

1988–1991 Seasons (First Grand Finals)
Penrith developed a strong team in the late 80s and started to build momentum. They made their first Grand Final appearance in 1990 with a team boasting notable players the likes of Greg Alexander, John Cartwright, Brad Fittler and Mark Geyer only to be beaten by the Canberra Raiders 18–14. The next year Penrith met Canberra again in the Grand Final, this time winning 19–12, including two tries by Royce Simmons the former team captain in his last game. They went on to play Wigan in England for the 1991 World Club Challenge but were beaten by the British champions 21–4.

1992–1995 Seasons (Downfall)
Their reign was short-lived as in 1992 tragedy struck the club when the younger brother of Captain Greg Alexander, Ben, died in a car accident on June 21, 1992. Greg and close family friends Mark Geyer and Brad Fittler left the club soon after (Fittler left after the 1995 season as Penrith had signed with Super League) as well as coach Phil Gould left midway through the 1994 season.

Penrith were coached by former player and club captain Royce Simmons starting with the last six games in 1994 until the end of 2001.

1997–2000 Seasons (Back to Finals)
They made the finals during the 1997 Super League season and then again in 2000 in the re-united NRL competition where they were defeated 28–10 by the Parramatta Eels in the elimination semi-final.

2001–2004 Season (Build to a Premiership)
In the 2001 NRL season, Penrith came last on the competition ladder. The same year was Royce Simmons' last season as coach for Penrith, and he was replaced by John Lang from Cronulla in 2002, where they finished 12th. Their last game of 2002 showed hope as they proceeded to thrash the Northern Eagles, knocking them out of the final eight.

2002 showed the promise that was to come the next year.  With the signing of Preston Campbell and Joe Galuvao, the side fired in 2003. Coming off 3 early season losses, they proceeded to lose only 3 other games for the rest of the competition with the local hero, Rhys Wesser scoring a new club record 25 tries. Penrith finished as Minor Premiers after convincingly accounting for the Parramatta Eels in the last round of competition. In the Finals series Penrith beat the Brisbane Broncos and New Zealand Warriors to reach the 2003 NRL Grand Final. Entering the match as underdogs, Penrith defeated the Roosters 18–6, with winger Luke Rooney scoring two tries. Hooker Luke Priddis, the other try-scorer for the Panthers, received the Clive Churchill Medal. The game is also remembered for a spectacular tackle by Scott Sattler in the 2nd Half, where he ran down and tackled Roosters winger Todd Byrne, who was sprinting down the left wing for an almost certain try. Penrith lost the 2004 World Club Challenge in the following pre-season, with the Bradford Bulls defeating them 22–4 in sub-zero temperatures. Penrith did however rally after that loss and once again qualified for the NRL semi-final series by finishing fourth and defeating St. George in the first week of the semi-finals before being knocked out by Canterbury-Bankstown in the Grand Final qualifier two weeks later.

2005–2009 Season (Continued Failures)
Penrith then just failed to qualify for the Top 8 in 2005 finishing two points out and in 10th spot on percentages. They endured another below-par season in 2006 this time falling well short of the finals finishing the year in 12th position. The 2007 season turned out to be a poor one for the Panthers, they won only eight games, finished last and "won" the wooden-spoon for the second time in six years after losing to the New Zealand Warriors in the last round of the regular season competition.

In 2008, Penrith improved four spots on their 2007 performance by finishing in 12th spot out of 16 teams in the NRL competition with 10 wins, one draw and 13 losses. In 2009 they finished the season in 11th spot out of 16 teams in the NRL competition with 11 wins, one draw and 12 losses.

In 2009, Penrith finished 11th. In round 21 of the 2009 NRL season, Penrith drew with the New Zealand Warriors 32–32 the 2nd highest drawn NRL game of all time.

2010 Season (Brief Finals Appearance)
In 2010, Penrith had an excellent season, finishing in 2nd place in the ladder out of the 16 teams, with 16 wins and 9 losses.  However, in the first round of the Finals series, they lost 24–22 at home to the Canberra Raiders and were knocked out in the second round when they lost 34–12 to the Sydney Roosters.

Michael Gordon played very well in that year, setting two new club records. In round 24, against the South Sydney Rabbitohs, he set a new club record for most points scored in one game: 30. By the end of the final game of the regular season, game 24, round 26, he had also set a new club record for the most points scored in one season at 270.

2011–2013 Seasons (Rebuilding the Club)
After a 2010 season where the club went above and beyond expectations, they were looking to starting the new season on a high. It wasn't to be, however, when they were thumped by Newcastle at the newly named Centrebet Stadium, 42–8. While round 2 went a lot better for the team, beating rivals the Eels at Parramatta Stadium 20–6, the year was marked by inconsistency as they finished 12th on the ladder.

In 2011, following another terrible start to the season, the Penrith board decided to sever ties with coach Matthew Elliot at season's end. On 20 June 2011 he stepped down as coach and that same day Steve Georgallis was appointed caretaker coach for the remainder of the season. On 29 June Ivan Cleary was announced as coach for the next 3 seasons, with Georgallis staying as assistant coach for the remainder of the season.

2012 was again a disappointing year for Penrith, finishing second last with an 8–16 record. However, the club discovered some new talent in the form of winger Josh Mansour, a candidate for Rookie of the Year, as well as fullback Lachlan Coote's successful move to five-eighth.

2013 began poorly for the Penrith; after a first up win against the Canberra Raiders, they went on to lose their next five games. However, a more inspired performance against the Parramatta Eels in round 7, where they won 44–12, was a trigger for a strong run; four wins from five games to see Penrith move into the top eight of the competition. The four wins included a 12–10 victory over the reigning premiers, Melbourne Storm, and a 64–6 thrashing of the New Zealand Warriors. However, after a year with mixed results, Penrith finished in tenth position, one win out of the top eight. At the end of the season, the likes of Luke Walsh, Lachlan Coote, Mose Masoe and Brad Tighe departed.

A playing roster overhaul saw the arrival of big name players such as Jamie Soward, Peter Wallace, Jamal Idris, Tyrone Peachey and Elijah Taylor at Penrith, while Matt Moylan took the vacant fullback role left by the departed Lachlan Coote.

2014 Season (Big signings paid off)
The 2014 NRL season was a good year for Penrith as they qualified for the finals and made it to the preliminary final before losing to the Bulldogs 18–12.

2015 Season (Continue Rebuilding Phase)
In the 2015 NRL season, Penrith endured a horror year on the field finishing second last. Penrith defeated bottom placed Newcastle in the final game of the season to avoid the wooden spoon.

2016–2018 Seasons (Multiple Finals appearances)
The Penrith Panthers celebrated their 50th year in the NRL in 2016. Penrith started the season with 7 wins and 9 losses, they then finished the season winning 7 from 8 games to finish in 6th. In week 1 of the finals they defeated Canterbury 28-12, the next week Penrith were knocked out by Canberra losing 12–22.

In 2017, Penrith finished 7th on the NRL Premiership table and qualified for the finals.  Penrith defeated Manly in week one of the finals 22–10 and then were defeated by Brisbane the following week 13–6 at Suncorp Stadium thus eliminating them from the competition. The Penrith reserve grade side fared much better, firstly winning the Intrust Super Premiership by defeating Wyong 20-12 and then defeating the PNG Hunters the following week in the NRL State Championship final 42-18.

In 2018, Penrith finished 5th on the table at the end of the regular season during which coach Anthony Griffin was sacked four weeks before the finals series after falling out with Phil Gould. Griffin was then replaced by Cameron Ciraldo for the remainder of the season. In week one of the finals, Penrith easily accounted for the New Zealand Warriors to set up a clash with Cronulla.  Although both clubs were admitted into the competition in 1967 this would provide the first meeting between the two clubs in a finals match. In a tight game, Cronulla defeated Penrith 21–20 ending their season.

2019 Season (High Expectations, Low Results)
Before the commencement of the 2019 NRL season, Penrith were predicted by many to challenge for the premiership and reach the finals. Penrith got off to a bad start with the club winning only 2 of their first 10 matches leaving the team bottom of the table. Penrith would then go on to win their next 7 games in a row leaving them just outside the finals places.  In a must win game against the Sydney Roosters in round 24, Penrith lost the match 22-6 at the Sydney Cricket Ground which meant that the club would miss out on the finals series for the first time since 2015.

2020–2021 Season (Back-to-back Grand Final appearances, Third Premiership)
Penrith started the 2020 NRL season with three wins and a draw before suffering a 16–10 loss to Parramatta. The club then went on a 15-game unbeaten run to claim the 2020 Minor Premiership, only the third time in the club's history they had achieved this feat.

Penrith would go on to reach the 2020 NRL Grand Final after going 17 games unbeaten throughout the year and in the finals. The opponents in the grand final were Melbourne who raced out to a 22–0 lead at half-time. Penrith came back in the second half of the game but lost the grand final 26–20 at Stadium Australia.

At the start of the 2021 NRL season, Penrith became the first team in Rugby League History to win their opening two games without conceding a point as they beat North Queensland 24–0 and then defeated Canterbury 28-0.

In round 4 of the 2021 NRL season, Penrith defeated Manly-Warringah 46–6 at Brookvale Oval inflicting Manly's worst ever home defeat. The win also meant that Penrith had their best start to a season since 1997 when they won their opening four games in that year. It extended Penrith's longest away winning streak to 10 which is tied in 1st all time in the NRL.

In round 5 of 2021 NRL season, Penrith defeated Canberra 30–10 at Penrith Stadium. It was Penrith's best start to a season in their history. Penrith also became the first team to win 20 straight regular season games.

In round 6 of 2021 NRL season, Penrith defeated Brisbane 20–12 at Lang Park. It continued Penrith's best start to a season, And also became the first team to win 21 straight regular season games. This win also made Penrith hold the record for most consecutive away wins (11).

The club would finish the 2021 regular season in second place, equal on points with Minor Premiers Melbourne but missed out on first place due to points differential. Penrith would then lose their opening match of the 2021 finals series losing to South Sydney 16–10.

In the week two elimination final, Penrith played against Parramatta for the first time in the finals since 2000. In the lowest scoring game of the year, Penrith won the match 8–6. In the aftermath, the club was fined $25,000 by the NRL after allegedly breaching the rules of the game in their victory over Parramatta.  In a crucial part of the match with Parramatta on the attack, Penrith trainer Pete Green ran onto the field which stopped play as he attended to hooker Mitch Kenny in the 76th minute.  The NRL rules state that trainers must not signal to the referee to stop play until an initial assessment has been performed, which was not done, and only then it should be stopped for serious injury.

In the 2021 preliminary final, Penrith gained revenge against Melbourne by winning the match 10–6 and booking a place in the 2021 NRL Grand Final against South Sydney.

Penrith met South Sydney in the 2021 NRL Grand Final and looked to redeem their loss in the previous years' Grand Final. The Penrith club finished the game in a thrilling 14–12 victory to claim their third premiership in the club's history with Co-Captain Nathan Cleary securing the Clive Churchill Medal for his outstanding performance in the match.

On 8 October, the Penrith club were placed under investigation by the NRL after photos emerged which showed that the Provan-Summons Trophy had been damaged. The photos showed that the trophy had been separated from the base and surrounding wreath. Another image on social media also showed the trophy being treated as a baby with the bronzed artwork being carried around in a stroller.
The following week, it was announced that the Penrith players had been cleared of any wrongdoing in relation to the broken trophy. It was revealed that the trophy had been broken by a fan who had accidentally knocked it off the table which caused the trophy to break off at the base.  On 19 October 2021, Nathan Cleary and Stephen Crichton were handed proposed fines of $7000 and $4000 by the NRL along with breach notices. This was in relation to both players caught on social media acting in a disrespectful manner toward the NRL Telstra Premiership Trophy. The NRL alleged Cleary and Crichton showed disrespect towards the individuals depicted in the iconic moment on the Trophy.  On the same day, Tyrone May was stood down by the club and handed a breach notice along with a proposed fine of $7500.  The NRL alleged May acted contrary to the best interests of the game for posting and being part of social media posts which do not align with the values of the game. On the 3 November 2021, Tyrone May was terminated with immediate effect following the grand final antics, as well as to previous breaches dating back to 2019. “As a club we understand our responsibilities to the game, our corporate partners, our members and fans, and the wider Rugby League community," Panthers CEO Brian Fletcher said.
"The Board observed due process in this matter and considered all relevant factors before reaching its final decision. "Panthers will coordinate with the NRL to ensure Tyrone receives access to any support services he needs moving forward."

2022 (Back-to-back Premiership wins, Third straight Grand Final appearance, Fourth Premiership)
Penrith started the 2022 NRL season in strong fashion winning their opening eight matches in a row.  In round 9, the club was defeated 22-20 by Parramatta at Penrith Stadium which ended their 21-game winning streak at the ground that stretched all the way back to the 2019 NRL season.
In round 23 against South Sydney, Penrith secured their fourth minor premiership by winning 26-22 at Stadium Australia.
Penrith would then go on to win both their finals matches against Parramatta and South Sydney respectively to reach the 2022 NRL Grand Final.  In the final, Penrith took an 18-0 lead at half-time against Parramatta before running out winners 28-12 to secure their second consecutive title and becoming only the second team after the Sydney Roosters to win back to back titles in the NRL era.  Following the grand final victory, the Penrith club came under scrutiny from sections of the media for their behaviour after the premiership win with James Fisher-Harris and Jarome Luai coming under the most criticism for their comments directed towards Parramatta.
Before the start of the 2023 NRL season, Penrith played against the Super League champions St Helens R.F.C. in the 2023 World Club Challenge. Penrith went into the game as heavy favourites but suffered a shock 13-12 defeat in golden point extra-time.

Honours
Premierships (4) 

1991, 2003, 2021, 2022

Runners-up (2)  
1990, 2020

Minor Premierships (4)  
1991, 2003, 2020, 2022

Reserve Grade (4)  
1987, 2014, 2017, 2022

NRL State Championship (2)  
2017, 2022

Jersey Flegg Cup (5)  
1977, 1986, 2006, 2007, 2022

S.G. Ball Cup (8)  
1977, 1981, 1985, 2000, 2006, 2016, 2018, 2022

Harold Matthews Cup (7) 
1979, 1985, 1989, 2002, 2005, 2006, 2010

NYC Premiership (2) 
2013, 2015

Third Grade (1) 
1978

Wills Cup (1)  
1968

Sponsorship
Throughout their history, the Panthers have gone through 10 major sponsors (These sponsors appear on the chest of the jersey).

FEENEY (1977)
Alpha Micro (1984–85)
Radio 2KA (1986–87)
Penrith City (1988)
Calphos (1989)
Dahdah Uniforms (1990–1993)
Prospect Electricity (1994–1995)
Classifieds (1996)
Sanyo (2000–2011)
OAK Milk (2012–present)

Kit suppliers

Peerless Sports (19??–1996)
Nike (1997–1998)
Classic Sportswear (1999–2003)
ISC (2004–2012)
Asics (2013–2017)
Classic Sportswear (2018–2019)
O'Neills (2020–present)

Emblem and colours

 Penrith's uniform colours in the 1966 NSWRL Second Division and earlier years were blue and white but due to the Cronulla-Sutherland side registering a predominantly blue jersey design first, and with Newtown, Canterbury, Eastern Suburbs and Parramatta also displaying various shades of blue, Penrith went in search of an alternative. A decision was made to change their colours to Brown with a white V. This decision subsequently earned them the affectionate name of the "Chocolate Soldiers" thanks to radio commentator Frank Hyde who wrote in the Penrith Club journal "these chocolate soldiers from out west – they don't melt!".

The team had been referred to as the 'Panthers' as early as 1970.

In 1974 Penrith changed their strip to a jerseys with brown and white vertical bars and again in 1991 they changed the colours to Black with White, Red, Yellow and Green stripes (drawing another confectionery-related nickname, the Liquorice Allsorts) until 1997 when Super League had all new jerseys made by Nike. The yellow was all but removed from the jersey at this stage. Then in 2000 they changed the colours once more to Black, Rust red, Teal green and White.
In 2004 the design of the jersey changed once more to its current design. On Thursday, 23 November 2006 the club launched a new 'alternate/away' jersey predominantly white in colour as a stark contrast to its main design.
 Just before Christmas 2007 the Panthers launched a new 'home' jersey which is predominantly black with light grey claw marks on either side at the front and back. For Season 2010, the Panthers have launched a new predominantly teal away jersey, this teal jersey connect with the away jersey from their 03 and 04 season's. With their official colours still Black, Teal green and rust red the alternate jersey was chosen to represent their secondary colour. The inception of Teal into the colour palet of Panthers links directly back to the unique colour their 2nd division jerseys had before brown and white. 
In late October, 2010, the Panthers announced that rust would no longer be a secondary colour for the club. A  was also launched, black with grey claw marks on either side. The club's teal jersey was also scratched in Round 4, 2011, when a new white jersey with grey claw marks and teal and black stripes was announced the club's new alternate jersey.

For the 2014 season the Panthers wore a redesigned black home jersey while the white away jersey prominently displays the new club logo. The Pink Jersey was also retained as a 3rd alternate strip, and used for Women in League and Breast Cancer Awareness rounds, or when both strips would clash with the opposing side. There was also a special Indigenous Jersey, worn in round 23 for the Indigenous Awareness round.

The Penrith Panthers unveiled a 50th anniversary logo to be used in 2016.

In 2017, Penrith decided to revert to their Liquorice Allsorts jersey from The 1990s. The club had asked the fans in 2016 what jersey design they wanted and the majority voted for a return of the jersey the club won its first premiership in.  Panthers executive general manager Phil Gould said "This is the jersey you wanted, We will respect our past as we set about creating our future – and this is the jersey that will carry us forward, You know in 50 years here at Panthers we’ve had over 50 jerseys, Now wouldn't it be nice to have just one jersey for the next 50 years? I don't know if that is possible but this is where we need to start".

Following their elimination from the 2018 finals, on 26 September 2018, the Panthers introduced a re-coloured logo to take effect in 2019. The Panthers have now completely ditched teal and brought back the 'Liquorice Allsorts' colour scheme that has already featured in their jerseys since 2017.

Primary jerseys

Alternate jerseys

Heritage jerseys

Special jerseys

Nines jerseys

Penrith Panthers Leagues Club

The Penrith Panthers Rugby League Football Club is the major financier the Penrith Panthers Leagues Club (of the Panthers Entertainment Group).

The Panthers Entertainment Group has six licensed club sites in NSW – Penrith, Port Macquarie, Bathurst, North Richmond, Glenbrook and Wallacia. The clubs cater for a wide range of activities for members, their families and guests.

Rivalries

Parramatta Eels

Parramatta entered the NSWRL now NRL competition in 1947, meanwhile Penrith entered 20 years later in 1967. Parramatta are the closest NRL team to Penrith geographically.

Former Penrith player Reagan Campbell-Gillard spoke about Penrith and Parramatta saying "As a Penrith junior, you come through the system to hate them. “I also don't like that word but it is. It doesn't matter what form you're in, it's a game you get up for".

In 2002, Parramatta thrashed the Penrith 64–6, this coming after a season in which Parramatta finished first on the ladder and Penrith last. But they would not meet again until Round 26, 2003, when Penrith, in front of a then-record crowd defeated Parramatta 40–22 denying the Eels a place in the finals (Parramatta had to win by 28+ points). Penrith went on to win the premiership that year. Round 17, 2009 saw a Penrith win by 38–34 in which the lead changed several times, before Parramatta recorded a huge 48-6 win in the penultimate round of the 2009 NRL season.

In the 2010 NRL season, Parramatta came from 22-0 down at half-time against Penrith to win 34–28 at Penrith Stadium with Parramatta player Jarryd Hayne starring with a man of the match performance.

Penrith then spoiled Nathan Hindmarsh's 300th NRL game in Round 19 of the 2011 NRL Season. The Eels were up by 6 with two seconds to play before Penrith's Michael Jennings made a break and kicked ahead for Lachlan Coote to score and force the game into overtime. Halfback Luke Walsh then kicked a field goal in extra time to consign Hindmarsh to a 23-22 loss in his milestone match. 
 
In round 5 of the 2020 NRL season, Parramatta came back from a 10-0 deficit at the 61st minute to beat Penrith 16–10, that would be Penrith's only loss in the 2020 NRL regular season that year as Penrith finished as minor premiers. In 2021, Penrith won both regular season games against Parramatta, the first being a 1-point thriller at Penrith. Parramatta had a chance in the dying seconds to win the match, which was supposedly to cement Mitchell Moses against Adam Reynolds for a position as half-back in the New South Wales State of Origin squad to replace the injured Nathan Cleary. The other match played in Queensland due to the Sydney Coronavirus outbreak, saw Penrith defeat Parramatta, who rested their star players for the finals by 40–6.  In the 2022 regular season, Parramatta were the only club to beat Penrith twice and were also responsible for ending Penrith's unbeaten home winning streak which went back to the 2019 NRL season.

Since Penrith entered the competition in 1967, the two clubs have only met in finals five times. The last being in the 2022 NRL Grand Final where Parramatta were beaten by Penrith 28-12 at Accor Stadium.

Players

2023 squad

2023 Signings & Transfers

Gains
 Jack Cogger - Huddersfield Giants (Super League)
 Luke Garner - Wests Tigers
 Zac Hosking - Brisbane Broncos
 Tyrone Peachey - Wests Tigers

Losses
 Christian Crichton - Released
 Kurt Falls - Released
 J'maine Hopgood - Parramatta Eels
 Robert Jennings - The Dolphins 
 Isaiya Katoa - The Dolphins 
 Viliame Kikau - Canterbury-Bankstown Bulldogs 
 Api Koroisau - Wests Tigers 
 Sean O'Sullivan - The Dolphins 
 Preston Riki - Released
 Charlie Staines - Wests Tigers

Notable players

Representative players

Panthers Team of Legends
On 4 October 2006, a 40th anniversary Panthers Team of Legends was selected by a committee of experts and named at the Panthers' annual gala evening.

Hall of Fame
On 25 June 2016, the Panthers inducted the four inaugural members of its Hall of Fame - Grahame Moran, Royce Simmons, Greg Alexander, and Craig Gower.

Head-to-head records

Discontinued teams

Finals appearances
17 (1985, 1988, 1989, 1990, 1991, 1997, 2000, 2003, 2004 2010, 2014, 2016, 2017, 2018, 2020, 2021, 2022)

Coaches
There have been 20 coaches of the Panthers since their first season in 1967.
The current coach is Ivan Cleary.

Records

Most points in a match: 34 by Nathan Cleary in Round 25, 2019 NRL season.
Largest win: 72-12 against Manly-Warringah Sea Eagles, 7 August 2004

Supporters
Notable fans
Jason Arnberger, Australian Cricketer
Nathan Bracken, Australian Cricketer
James Courtney, Supercars driver
Pat Cummins, Australian Cricketer
Anton Devcich, New Zealand Cricketer
Mick Fanning, Australian professional surfer
Kurt Fearnley, Paralympic wheelchair racer
John Hastings, Australian Cricketer
Matthew Nielsen, Olympic basketball player
Leonardo Zappavigna, Australian professional boxer

Season statistics

Footnotes

References

External links

Official Penrith Panthers Web Site
Hawkesbury Radio 89.9FM Broadcaster of Penrith Panthers games
Penrith Panthers History at yesterdayshero.com.au

 
National Rugby League clubs
Rugby league teams in Sydney
Rugby clubs established in 1966
Fan-owned football clubs
Fictional panthers